Kevin Lesley Ross (born January 16, 1962) is a former American football cornerback and safety and the current cornerbacks coach for the Tampa Bay Buccaneers. Ross was drafted in the 7th round of the 1984 NFL Draft with the 173rd overall selection by the Kansas City Chiefs, where he spent his first 10 seasons. He also played two seasons with the Atlanta Falcons, one year with the San Diego Chargers, then returned to the Chiefs for one season in 1997.

Playing career
Ross played high school football at Paulsboro High School in Paulsboro, New Jersey, and went on to attend Temple University.

As the Chiefs' seventh pick in the 1984 NFL Draft, he became a starter his rookie season and perfected a classic bump-and-run coverage that made him hard to beat in the secondary. For his career with the Kansas City Chiefs, he intercepted 30 passes and scored 5 touchdowns. Ross played in a total of 156 games for the Chiefs. He went to Atlanta as a free agent before the 1994 season and later returned to play in five games in 1997.

Along with former teammate Albert Lewis, Ross was named one of the NFL's top 10 all-time cornerback tandems by the NFL Network in July 2008.

Ross went to two NFL Pro Bowls and was inducted into the Kansas City Hall of Fame in 2011. He is  one of only three players in franchise history to score a touchdown in at least four different ways (two INTs, two blocked field goal returns, one fumble recovery and one blocked punt).

Coaching career

San Diego Chargers
He was the assistant secondary and quality control coach with the San Diego Chargers from 2007 to 2009. After the Chargers' 2009 playoff loss to the Pittsburgh Steelers, the Chargers' administration announced that they would not renew his contract for the following season.

Oakland Raiders
Ross was hired by the Oakland Raiders on March 5, 2010, as a defensive backs coach. He was not retained following the 2011 season.

Arizona Cardinals
Ross was hired by the Arizona Cardinals as their cornerbacks coach in 2013. He held that position until 2017.

Tampa Bay Buccaneers
Ross was hired by the Tampa Bay Buccaneers in 2019, reuniting him with Bruce Arians, to become the cornerbacks coach. As a coach for the Buccaneers, he won Super Bowl LV defeating the team he played eleven seasons for, the Chiefs 31–9, which was his first Super Bowl victory as a player or coach.

References

External links
 Arizona Cardinals bio

1962 births
Living people
African-American coaches of American football
African-American players of American football
American football safeties
American football cornerbacks
Temple Owls football players
Kansas City Chiefs players
Atlanta Falcons players
San Diego Chargers players
American Conference Pro Bowl players
Sportspeople from Gloucester County, New Jersey
Paulsboro High School alumni
People from Paulsboro, New Jersey
Players of American football from Camden, New Jersey
New York Sentinels coaches
21st-century African-American people
20th-century African-American sportspeople
Tampa Bay Buccaneers coaches
Ed Block Courage Award recipients